Lelići (Serbian Cyrillic: Лелићи) is a village located in the Užice municipality of Serbia. In the 2002 census, the village numbered 381 people.

Užice
Populated places in Zlatibor District